Ramon Rodrigues de Mesquita (born 15 June 1988) is a Brazilian footballer.

Club career
Mesquita joined Vietnamese side Than Quảng Ninh in January 2017. He was released along with fellow Brazilian Jardel in April of the same year.

On October 15, 2017, Mesquita accidentally collided into his Persela Lamongan teammate, goalkeeper Choirul Huda, during a match against Semen Padang FC. Huda suffered a hard collision on his chest and lower jaw, causing an oxygen deprivation that led to his death.

Career statistics

Club

Notes

Honours
Phitsanulok
 Thai League 3 Northern Region: 2022–23

References

1988 births
Living people
Brazilian footballers
Brazilian expatriate footballers
Association football defenders
Brasiliense Futebol Clube players
Brasília Futebol Clube players
Joinville Esporte Clube players
Sobradinho Esporte Clube players
Duque de Caxias Futebol Clube players
Clube Atlético Hermann Aichinger players
Sociedade Esportiva e Recreativa Caxias do Sul players
Than Quang Ninh FC players
Campeonato Brasileiro Série B players
V.League 1 players
Brazilian expatriate sportspeople in Vietnam
Expatriate footballers in Vietnam
Brazilian expatriate sportspeople in Indonesia
Expatriate footballers in Indonesia
Persela Lamongan players
Sportspeople from Federal District (Brazil)